The Lutherse Hofje is a hofje in Haarlem, Netherlands.

History
The hofje was founded by the Lutheran Church in 1615. Originally the people living in the hofje were members of this church, but nowadays only the board of the hofje is appointed by the Lutheran Church. The hofje adjoins the Lutheran church itself, and has an unusual addition in the garden, namely an outdoor pulpit. From this pulpit, the minister could address the women in the hofje.

With five houses, it is the smallest hofje in Haarlem.

Location: Witte Herenstraat 20

References

 Haarlemse Hofjes, Dr. G. H. Kurtz, Schuyt & Co. Haarlem 1972

History of Haarlem
Hofjes
1615 establishments in the Dutch Republic